Jorge Wálter Barrios Balestrasse (born 24 January 1961) is a retired football midfielder from Uruguay, who was nicknamed "Chifle" during his professional career. Having made his official debut on July 18, 1980 against Peru (0-0), Barrios obtained a total number of 60 international caps for the Uruguay national football team.

He was a Mundialito Winner at the 1980 Copa D'Oro, and he scored the first goal in the final game against Brazil (2-1) on January 10, 1981.

He represented his native country at the 1986 FIFA World Cup, against West Germany, Scotland (as captain) and Argentina wearing the number eight jersey.

Away of Uruguay, he made a significant career in Greece with Olympiakos for two years (1985-1987) and Levadiakos for four years (1987-1991).

After the end of his playing years Barrios became a manager and managed teams in Greece such as Doxa Dramas, Kavala FC and Ionikos. He also managed Olympiakos Nicosia of Cyprus.

Honours
Olympiacos
1986–87 Alpha Ethniki

References

External links
International statistics at rsssf
  Profile

1961 births
Living people
People from Las Piedras, Uruguay
Uruguayan footballers
Association football midfielders
Uruguayan Primera División players
Super League Greece players
Peñarol players
Montevideo Wanderers F.C. players
Uruguayan football managers
Expatriate football managers in Cyprus
Uruguay under-20 international footballers
Uruguay international footballers
1983 Copa América players
1986 FIFA World Cup players
1993 Copa América players
Levadiakos F.C. players
Olympiacos F.C. players
Uruguayan expatriate footballers
Expatriate footballers in Greece
Olympiakos Nicosia managers
Ionikos F.C. managers
Niki Volos F.C. managers
Kavala F.C. managers
Doxa Drama F.C. managers
Expatriate football managers in Greece
Copa América-winning players
Club Sportivo Cerrito managers
Montevideo Wanderers managers
Rampla Juniors managers